Singer Lake Bog is a 344-acre nature preserve in the U.S. state of Ohio. It is owned by the Cleveland Museum of Natural History. With more than fifty acres of leatherleaf bog, it is the largest of its kind in the state of Ohio. Within the nature preserve is a five acre kettle lake bog that features tamarack, poison sumac, cranberries, northern purple pitcher plant, round-leaved sundew and sphagnum.

It is located in southern Summit County near the city of Green, Ohio.

Flora 

It is home to two carnivorous plants: the northern purple pitcher plant and the round-leaved sundew.

Animals 
The bog is home to animals such as beavers, and squirrels. There have been wild domestic cats spotted at this bog.
Bogs of Ohio
Protected areas of Summit County, Ohio
Landforms of Summit County, Ohio